Dallas William Mayr (November 10, 1946 – January 24, 2018), better known by his pen name Jack Ketchum, was an American horror fiction author. He was the recipient of four Bram Stoker Awards and three further nominations. His novels included Off Season, Offspring, and Red, the latter two of which were adapted to film. In 2011, Ketchum received the World Horror Convention Grand Master Award for outstanding contribution to the horror genre.

Biography

Early life and education
Ketchum was born in Livingston, New Jersey, as the only child to German immigrant parents.  His father, Dallas William Mayr (1908–1997), served in the artillery during World War II and his mother, Evelyn Fahner Mayr (1915–1987), was an accountant and office manager. He earned a Bachelor of Arts degree in English from Emerson College in Boston, Massachusetts, and later taught at the high-school level in Brookline, Massachusetts, for two years.

Early years
A onetime actor, teacher, literary agent, lumber salesman, and soda jerk, Ketchum credited his childhood love of Elvis Presley, dinosaurs, and horror for getting him through his formative years. He began making up stories at a young age and explained that he spent much time in his room, or in the woods near his house, down by the brook: '[m]y interests [were] books, comics, movies, rock 'n roll, show tunes, TV, dinosaurs [...] pretty much any activity that didn't demand too much socializing, or where I could easily walk away from socializing'. He would make up stories using his plastic soldiers, knights, and dinosaurs as the characters. He was also big on Halloween, and his mother, being '[...] pretty good with the sewing machine [...]', ensured young Ketchum had an authentic costume; his favorites were Peter Pan and Superman. Ketchum further expressed an early interest in horror films such as  Nosferatu and the classic Universal Monsters such as The Hunchback of Notre Dame and The Phantom of the Opera.

Later, in his teen years, Ketchum was befriended by Robert Bloch, author of Psycho, who became his mentor. He supported Ketchum's work, just as his work was supported by his own mentor, H. P. Lovecraft. Ketchum's relationship with Bloch lasted until Bloch's death in 1994. Ketchum's parents were the owners of a luncheonette and soda fountain where Jack worked to support his writing, as a short-order cook during the day and a soda jerk after dark.

Ketchum worked many different jobs before completing his first novel (1980's controversial Off Season), including acting as agent for novelist Henry Miller at Scott Meredith Literary Agency, a pivotal point in his career; his extraordinary encounter with Miller at his home in the Pacific Palisades is one of the subjects of his memoir in Book of Souls. He also sold articles and stories — both fiction and nonfiction — to various rock 'n roll and men's magazines to supplement his income. His decision to eventually concentrate on novel writing was partly fueled by a preference for work that offered stability and longevity.

Throughout his life, Ketchum read widely and voraciously, authors such as Robert Bloch, Charles Bukowski, Jim Harrison, Franz Douskey and Ernest Hemingway. Apart from his proficiency as a short-story and magazine writer and having a vivid imagination, reading was the essential tool in the writing kit that led Ketchum from his 7th Grade A-Minus Essay to the Magazines and, eventually, to Off Season and beyond.

The Jerzy Livingston years
Before Ketchum turned to novel writing, he sold a prolific number of short fiction and articles to magazines. His initial pen name, Jerzy Livingston, came about during this period. Because he often had more than one piece published in a specific magazine, he would use his own name for the first byline and then adopt a pseudonym for the others. He came from Livingston, New Jersey, and at the time, had been reading work by the author Jerzy Kosiński: "I liked the in-joke. Hence, Jerzy Livingston." he explained. One of his best-known characters while writing as Jerzy Livingstone is Stroup, a play on Proust: Stroup, however, had zero understanding of people, even himself. Ketchum refers to Stroup as "[a] boozer. a loser. a homophobe. A highly questionable friend and unreliable lover. Misogynist as hell and for the most part proud of it." Stroup is the exact opposite of Marcel Proust, whom Ketchum calls "[a]rguably the most sensitive writer in history". Stroup appeared in the men's magazine Swank. He was resurrected in the tale "Sheep Meadow Story" that formed part of the book Triage (2001), a collection with Richard Laymon and Edward Lee. His exploits can be found collected in Broken on the Wheel of Sex: The Jerzy Livingston Years (2007).

Death
Ketchum died of cancer on January 24, 2018, in New York City at the age of 71.

Awards and nominations
 The Box — (1994) Bram Stoker Award for Best Short Story
 Right to Life — (1999) Bram Stoker Award nominee for Best Long Fiction
 Gone — (2000) Bram Stoker Award for Best Short Fiction
 The Lost — (2001) Bram Stoker Award nominee for Best Novel
 The Haunt — (2001) Bram Stoker Award nominee for Best Short Fiction
 Peaceable Kingdom — (2003) Bram Stoker Award for Best Collection
 Closing Time — (2003) Bram Stoker Award for Best Long Fiction
 World Horror Convention Grand Master Award (2011)
 I'm Not Sam — (2012) Bram Stoker Award nominee for Best Long Fiction (with Lucky McKee)
 I'm Not Sam — (2012) Shirley Jackson Award nominee for Best Novella (with Lucky McKee)

Bibliography

Novels

Filmography

Writer
 The Lost (2006)
 The Girl Next Door (2007)
 Red (2008)
 Offspring (2009)
 The Woman (2011)
 Mail Order (short, 2011)
 Olivia (short, 2013)
 XX ("The Box" segment, 2017)

Actor
 The Lost (2006) as Teddy Panik
 Header (2006) as State Trooper No. 2
 The Girl Next Door (2007) as Carnival
 Red (2008) as Bartender
 Offspring (2009) as Max Joseph

Self
 The Cult of Ichi (2007)
 The Making of The Girl Next Door (2007)
 Dark Dreamers (2011)
 Inside the Plain Brown Wrapping (2013)

See also
 Cemetery Dance Publications
 World Horror Convention Grand Master Award
 List of horror fiction writers
 Splatterpunk

References

External links

 Official Website 
 
 

1946 births
2018 deaths
American horror writers
20th-century American novelists
Splatterpunk
People from Livingston, New Jersey
Emerson College alumni
Novelists from New Jersey
21st-century American novelists
American male novelists
20th-century American male writers
21st-century American male writers
Deaths from cancer in New York (state)
20th-century pseudonymous writers
21st-century pseudonymous writers